Communist Party of Turkey (in Turkish: Türkiye Komünist Partisi) is a clandestine political party in Turkey. The party, which split from the historical Communist Party of Turkey in 1978, is often known as Communist Party of Turkey (Workers Voice);  because the main publication of the party is İşçinin Sesi (Workers Voice).  However the party considers itself as the continuation of the historical entity.

In the 1980s and 1990s it had strong links with the group around John Chamberlain (who uses the pen-name of "Jack Conrad") and his supporters who publish the Weekly Worker in Britain. Some members of Chamberlain's group went so far as to join the TKP.

See also 
 List of illegal political parties in Turkey
 Communist Party of Turkey (disambiguation) for other communist parties in Turkey

External links
Party website

1978 establishments in Turkey
Clandestine groups
Communist parties in Turkey
Far-left politics in Turkey
Organizations designated as terrorist by Turkey
Political parties established in 1978